Wade von Grawbadger is a comic book artist who is known mostly for his inking work for Marvel and DC comics. He is well known for his collaborations with Stuart Immonen.

Inker

DC Comics
 Alpha Centurion Special #1
 Batman Black and White vol. 5 #5
 Birds of Prey: Manhunt #1, 3, 4
 Showcase '95 #1, 2
 Starman #0-10, 12–27, 29–37, 39–40, 42–45, 47, 50 (October 1994 - February 1999)

Marvel Comics
 Avengers vol. 3 #26
 Captain Marvel vol. 3 #8
 New Avengers vol. 1 #55-62; vol. 2 #1-7
 Fear Itself vol. 1 #1-7
 Secret Avengers vol. 1 #21

Awards
 1995: Nominated for "Best Penciller/Inker or Penciller/Inker Team" Eisner Award, with Tony Harris for Starman
 1997:
 Won the "Best Serialized Story" Eisner Award, with James Robinson, Tony Harris and Guy Davis for Starman #20-23: "Sand and Stars"
 Nominated for "Best Continuing Series" Eisner Award, with James Robinson and Tony Harris for Starman
 Nominated for "Best Penciller/Inker or Penciller/Inker Team" Eisner Award, with Tony Harris for Starman
 2009: Won "Best Inker," Inkwell Awards
 2011: Nominated for "Best Inker," Inkwell Awards
 2014: Won "Best Inker," Harvey Awards
 2015: Won "Props Award," Inkwell Awards
 2016: Nominated "Favorite Inker," Inkwell Awards
 2016: Nominated "Most Adaptable Inker," Inkwell Awards
 2016: Won "Props Award," Inkwell Awards

References

External links
 
 

Living people
American comics artists
Year of birth missing (living people)